The Peacemaker is a 1922 British silent drama film directed by A. E. Coleby.

Cast
 A. E. Coleby as Big Ben Buckle  
 Henry Nicholls-Bates as Ted Staples 
 Bob Vallis as Jim Blakeley 
 Sam Austin as Fred Smith  
 Maud Yates as Miss Brown  
 Minna Leslie as Widow Smith  
 Frank Wilson as Charles Wilkes  
 Humberston Wright as George Brownlow

References

Bibliography
 Low, Rachael. History of the British Film, 1918-1929. George Allen & Unwin, 1971.

External links
 

1922 films
1922 drama films
British drama films
British silent feature films
Films directed by A. E. Coleby
Stoll Pictures films
British black-and-white films
1920s English-language films
1920s British films
Silent drama films